Involuntary muscle may refer to:

  Smooth muscle tissue
  Cardiac muscle